Hazdayi Penso (8 March 1914 – 28 September 1986) was a Turkish basketball player. He competed in the men's tournament at the 1936 Summer Olympics.

References

External links
 

1914 births
1986 deaths
Turkish men's basketball players
Olympic basketball players of Turkey
Basketball players at the 1936 Summer Olympics
Sportspeople from Çanakkale
20th-century Turkish people